Port Stephens may refer to:
 Port Stephens Council (also known simply as Port Stephens),  New South Wales, Australia
 Port Stephens, Falkland Islands
 Port Stephens (New South Wales), a natural harbour in Australia
 Electoral district of Port Stephens, New South Wales, Australia